Jaxson Reed Hayes (born May 23, 2000) is an American professional basketball player for the New Orleans Pelicans of the National Basketball Association (NBA). He played college basketball for the Texas Longhorns.

High school career
Hayes attended Moeller High School in Cincinnati, Ohio. He grew from six feet as a freshman to 6'11" as a senior. In 2018 he took part in the Junior International Tournament (JIT), in Lissone, Italy, leading Team Ohio to the win of its fifth title. As a senior, he averaged 12 points, seven rebounds and four blocks per game. He committed to the University of Texas to play college basketball.

College career
As a freshman at Texas, Hayes averaged 10.0 points and 5.0 rebounds per game while shooting 72.8% from the field. He scored a career-high 19 points along with seven boards, two steals and a block in a 69–56 loss to TCU. Hayes injured his left knee in a loss to Kansas in the Big 12 Tournament. He was named Big 12 Freshman of the Year. On April 11, 2019, Hayes declared for the NBA draft, forfeiting his remaining three years of eligibility.

Professional career

New Orleans Pelicans (2019–present) 
On June 20, 2019, the Atlanta Hawks selected Hayes with the eighthth overall pick of the 2019 NBA draft and then had his draft rights traded, along with the draft rights to Nickeil Alexander-Walker, the draft rights to Didi Louzada and a heavily protected 2020 first round pick, to New Orleans Pelicans in exchange for the draft rights to De'Andre Hunter and Solomon Hill. The trade was officially completed on July 7.

Hayes made his NBA debut for the Pelicans on October 10, 2019, scoring 19 points on 8-of-11 shooting against the Golden State Warriors in an 11 point loss. On November 17, he made his first career start in place of the injured Derrick Favors, achieving his first double-double with 10 points and 10 rebounds along with 3 blocks in a 108–100 victory over the Golden State Warriors. On January 9, 2020, Hayes recorded his second NBA double-double, scoring 14 points and adding 12 rebounds to go along with 4 blocks in under 24 minutes of play. Days later, Hayes recorded 18 points and 10 rebounds in a victory over the New York Knicks, tallying consecutive double-doubles for the first time in his NBA career. The following night, Hayes posted a then career-high 20 points in a 35 point loss to the Boston Celtics.

On May 7, 2021, Hayes scored a season-high 19 points in a 107–109 loss to the Philadelphia 76ers. On May 14, he matched this total in a 122–125 loss to the Golden State Warriors.

Hayes saw minimal playing time to start the 2021–22 season. On December 6, 2021, the Pelicans assigned him to their NBA G League affiliate, the Birmingham Squadron. He was recalled from the G League two days later. On January 1, 2022, Hayes scored a season-high 23 points, alongside seven rebounds, in a 113–136 loss to the Milwaukee Bucks. He again scored 23 points, alongside twelve rebounds, on April 5, 2022, during a 123–109 win over the Sacramento Kings that helped the Pelicans clinch a play-in tournament spot. During the second half of the season, Hayes moved into the starting lineup and averaged 10.7 points and 5.7 rebounds per game over the last 23 games of the season. The Pelicans qualified for their first playoff appearance since 2018 after play-in wins over the San Antonio Spurs and Los Angeles Clippers.

The Pelicans faced the Phoenix Suns during the first round of the playoffs. On April 22, 2022, during a 111–114 Game 3 loss, Hayes was ejected after receiving a flagrant 2 foul for pushing Suns forward Jae Crowder. Hayes finished the game with four points and six rebounds in only ten minutes of action. The Pelicans wound up losing the series in six games.

Career statistics

NBA

Regular season

|-
| style="text-align:left;"| 
| style="text-align:left;"| New Orleans
| 64 || 14 || 16.9 || .672 || .250 || .647 || 4.0 || .9 || .4 || .9 || 7.4
|-
| style="text-align:left;"| 
| style="text-align:left;"| New Orleans
| 60 || 3 || 16.1 || .625 || .429 || .775 || 4.3 || .6 || .4 || .6 || 7.5
|-
| style="text-align:left;"| 
| style="text-align:left;"| New Orleans
| 70 || 28 || 20.0 || .616 || .351 || .766 || 4.5 || .6 || .5 || .8 || 9.3
|- class="sortbottom"
| style="text-align:center;" colspan="2"|Career
| 194 || 45 || 17.7 || .634 || .360 || .723 || 4.3 || .7 || .4 || .8 || 8.1

Playoffs

|-
| style="text-align:left;"|2022
| style="text-align:left;"|New Orleans
| 6 || 6 || 13.8 || .560 || .000 || .636 || 2.5 || .2 || .0 || .3 || 5.8
|- class="sortbottom"
| style="text-align:center;" colspan="2"|Career
| 6 || 6 || 13.8 || .560 || .000 || .636 || 2.5 || .2 || .0 || .3 || 5.8

College

|-
| style="text-align:left;"| 2018–19
| style="text-align:left;"| Texas
| 32 || 21 || 23.3 || .728 || – || .740 || 5.0 || .3 || .6 || 2.2 || 10.0
|- class="sortbottom"
| style="text-align:center;" colspan="2"|Career
| 32 || 21 || 23.3 || .728 || – || .740 || 5.0 || .3 || .6 || 2.2 || 10.0

Personal life
Hayes father, Jonathan Hayes, played in the National Football League (NFL) and was the head coach of the XFL’s St. Louis BattleHawks. His mother, Kristi (Kinne), played basketball at Drake University (1991–95) and earned honorable mention Kodak All-American accolades and Missouri Valley Conference Player of the Year honors as a senior (1994–95). She recorded 3,406 career points during her four years (1987–91) at Jefferson-Scranton High School in Jefferson, Iowa. She previously served as an assistant women’s basketball coach at Oklahoma, Iowa, and Southern Illinois-Carbondale. Hayes has 3 siblings; Jillian, a varsity basketball player at Loveland High School who committed to play basketball at the University of Cincinnati, Jewett, and Jonah.

Hayes was arrested on July 28, 2021 and resisted arrest by the Los Angeles Police Department. Officers were investigating a radio call that involved a domestic dispute between Hayes and his girlfriend. Hayes shoved an officer into a wall and was treated for minor injuries before being taken into custody.

References

External links
Texas Longhorns bio

2000 births
Living people
American men's basketball players
Atlanta Hawks draft picks
Basketball players from Oklahoma
Birmingham Squadron players
New Orleans Pelicans players
Power forwards (basketball)
Sportspeople from Norman, Oklahoma
Texas Longhorns men's basketball players